The Diocese of Niassa (pt. Diocese Anglicana do Niassa) it is one of the three Anglican dioceses of Mozambique, part of the Anglican Church of Mozambique and Angola. This diocese is geographically the central of the three, the others being the Diocese of Lebombo and the Diocese of Nampula.

History
Mark van Koevering, an American of Dutch descent, was the diocesan bishop from 2003 to 2015. The diocese itself was not able to elect a bishop after three days of election to succeed him and so it was delegated to the synod of bishops of the Anglican Church of Southern Africa in September 2016 where the Synod elected Vicente Msosa as the bishop elect, being consecrated bishop of the Diocese of Niassa on 25 February 2017.

Structure
Niassa diocese is divided into six archdeaconries: Cobue, Lunho, Lichinga, Milange, Rio Chire and Lurio.

The diocese has 426 congregations, over 65,500 worshipers, and 55 priests. It has a link with the Diocese of London in the Church of England.

List of bishops 
 Paulo Zuizane Litumbe 1979-1985
 Paulino Manhique 1985-2003
 Mark van Koevering 2003-2015
 Vicente Msosa 2017-2021
 Lucas Mchema 2022-present

On 5 December 2021, Vincente Msosa was transferred from Niassa to Zambezia; on 6 May 2022, Lucas Mchema was elected to become bishop of the diocese. Mchema was consecrated bishop on 9 July 2022 at Messumba.

Coat of arms 
The diocese registered a coat of arms at the Bureau of Heraldry in 2001 : Per fess wavy Or and Azure, in chief a dug-out issuant Brunatre, seated therein a fisherman proper, vested about the loins Argent and holding pendant from a handline Sable a fish Argent, in base three barrulets wavy of the last; the shield ensigned of a mitre proper.

Anglican realignment
Under Bishop Vicente Msosa leadership, the Diocese of Niassa has been supportive of the Anglican realignment. He was one of the two bishops of the Anglican Church of Southern Africa to attend GAFCON III, in Jerusalem, on 17-22 June 2018.

References

External links 
 Diocese of Niassa

Anglicanism in Mozambique
1979 establishments in Mozambique